Chrysopistus is a genus of beetles in the family Buprestidae, containing the following species:

 Chrysopistus aeneoviridis Fisher, 1930
 Chrysopistus deyrollei Thery, 1923
 Chrysopistus flammeus (Thomson, 1857)
 Chrysopistus minimus Thery, 1923
 Chrysopistus savangvattanai Baudon, 1962
 Chrysopistus sumatrensis Obenberger, 1928

References

Buprestidae genera